The South Australian Railways E class was a class of  steam locomotives acquired to work passenger and goods train services on the South Australian Railways broad gauge system.

History
In January 1862, Slaughter Gruning & Co, Bristol delivered two  locomotives to the Melbourne and Essendon Railway Company. Only one was required, so the second was sold to the South Australian Railways in April 1862 entering service numbered 10. It was joined by the other locomotive in January 1865 numbered 13. A third example was delivered by the Avonside Engine Company, Bristol in September 1865 and numbered 14.

In 1878, a further three that had been made redundant by a gauge conversion project were purchased from the Canterbury Provincial Railways of New Zealand. All were aboard the ship Hyderabad which ran aground on Waitarere Beach between Otaki and Foxton on 24 June 1878. They eventually arrived at Port Adelaide on other ships. The first entered traffic in April 1880.

In September 1881, No. 13 was converted to a tender locomotive for use on the Kapunda to Adelaide line. A seventh was built in 1882 by the Adelaide Locomotive Works using parts from other locomotives. Number 13 was the first withdrawn in September 1896, with the last, 49 and 51, withdrawn in April 1929.

Class list

References

Further reading
"The E-Class Tank Engines of South Australia" Australian Railway Society Bulletin issue 373 November 1968 pages 375-380

External links

Avonside locomotives
Railway locomotives introduced in 1862
E
2-4-0 locomotives
Broad gauge locomotives in Australia 
Scrapped locomotives